Allsvenskan 1991, part of the 1991 Swedish football season, was the 67th Allsvenskan season played. IFK Göteborg won the league ahead of runners-up Örebro SK, and advanced to Mästerskapsserien 1991 along with the teams placed 3 to 6, while the teams placed 7 to 10 advanced to Kvalsvenskan 1991.

Spring 1991

League table

Results

Autumn 1991

Mästerskapsserien 1991

Results

Kvalsvenskan 1991

Promotions, relegations and qualifications

Season statistics

Top scorers

Footnotes

References 

Print

Online

Allsvenskan seasons
Swed
Swed
1